This is a list of characters from the animated television series Atomic Betty.

Main characters

Betty Barrett/Atomic Betty
Betty Barrett (Tajja Isen), is the main title protagonist of the series. On Earth, to most of her friends and family, she is a typical 12-year-old girl who enjoys visiting her grandmother, daydreaming about living in outer space, singing in her band, goofing off, and hanging out with her friends. She is not afraid to speak her mind, either, and dislikes any form of bullying, snobbery, and injustice. However, when there is trouble in deep space, she captains her own star-cruiser as Atomic Betty, a famously powerful and beautiful female Galactic Guardian and defender of the cosmos. In space, she investigates crimes and fights evil. Betty is very athletic, as she enjoys and excels in playing various sports; she is skilled at hand-to-hand combat, kickboxing, and karate, but is also equipped with a wide variety of Galactic Guardian-issued bracelet, housing a communications device and remote controls for her spaceship and its teleporter, as well as an array of gadgets and weapons. Her bracelet not only enables her to transform into her superpowered Galactic Guardian battle suit, but also has a holographic disguise function, and grants her basic telekinetic abilities as well.

Betty had been the only one to object to Galactic Guardian Headquarters moving to Earth and her hometown, having preferred another planet (or even an isolated location on Earth's area). In Mission: Earth, she has become more commanding in her Galactic Guardian duties, due to the stresses involved with Galactic Guardian Headquarters having moved to her hometown, the increased involvement of her spaceship crew in her daily life, her blooming romance with Penelope's older brother Chaz, and the fact that an increasing number of villains have targeted Earth and her school area.

It is never revealed how and at what age Betty was recruited to join the Galactic Guardians. However, some episodes have shown Betty training with her martial arts master, Spindly Tam Kanushu when she was younger in her home planet, Bane of Fragnog. Also, in the first season, Betty at first thought that she was the only human ever to be chosen to be a Galactic Guardian, until she discovered her grandmother Bea was one of the first Galactic Guardians, under the name Beatrixo.

Betty is a human/alien hybrid; she has red hair, usually worn in a ponytail, and emerald green eyes. In Mission: Earth onward, on Earth, her new usual outfit worn on her body consists of her yellow short-sleeve tee shirt with green highlights and a big green nuclear symbol on the center and her blue long-leg full-length slacks with light blue cuffs on the bottom, but the rest of her original usual outfit from the show itself can still be worn on her body.

When on a mission for action, she wears her standard Galactic Guardian uniform, which consists of her white head-dress, pink dress, white gloves, pink bracelet, white belt with a nuclear symbol, and white thigh-high boots. She also always sports red lipstick while using her suit.

Sparky
Sparky (Rick Miller) is Betty's alien lieutenant and pilot, with a large nose, green skin, and blue hair. Although he is sometimes reckless, and often more interested in eating, surfing, or girls than the mission he is on, he is nevertheless very loyal to Betty and endeavors to do his best at all times. Also, despite his immaturity that he expresses in his quarreling with a fellow crew member, X-5, he is shown throughout the early series to be a very skilled pilot and combatant.

With Galactic Guardian headquarters moved to Moose Jaw Heights following the events of "No Space Like Home", Sparky has an increased presence in Betty's personal life; he is a classmate of Betty purported to hail from Saskatoon. However, with more situations taking place on Earth, he has rarely seen piloting a ship and is often distracted when Betty needs his assistance.

In "Girl Power", Sparky is accidentally transformed into a girl via a magic crystal during a battle with Pontifidora. Sparky reacts positively to the transformation and even befriends Betty's new friend, Regeena (while in girl form). Sparky is later returned to normal after the crystal is destroyed. Upon returning to normal Sparky admits he didn't mind being a girl and would have preferred to remain that way. Afterward Sparky manages to pass himself off to Regeena as his girl self's brother.

Robot X-5
X-5 (Bruce Hunter), the third member of Betty's crew, is a roughly rectangular, yellow, hovering robot. He tends to spout too much information at inopportune times and takes things exceptionally seriously, which usually grates on Sparky's nerves. The two of them have a grudgingly respectful working relationship.  Though it is implied that he is an outdated robot model, newer model robots have tended to be less reliable.  In the third season, he also becomes an inventor, inventing new gadgets that are used by Betty on her missions. When he visits Betty's home, he tries to "improve" upon the kitchen appliances in Betty's house, believing them to be primitive.

Admiral DeGill
Admiral DeGill (Adrian Truss) is the commanding officer of the Galactic Guardians and Betty's immediate superior, assigning her to her missions. He resembles an orange goldfish with a crew cut of white hair and a muscular physique. He's often seen holding and using a Corncob pipe (which blows bubbles). DeGill radiates professionalism and takes his role as a commander very seriously, but has nevertheless managed to strike a balance between his duties and his recreational pursuits.

DeGill is one of the founding members of the Galactic Guardians, and in later episodes is always accompanied by three escorts, known collectively as the Rockettes. In most episodes, he is often seen doing activities with them while issuing Betty her orders. Following the destruction of Galactic Guardian Headquarters, he decides to construct a new headquarters underneath Moose Jaw, which was opposed only by Betty; one apparent reason was his desire to visit various landmarks on Earth (Niagara Falls among them), as well as the fact that his favorite beverage, espresso, is in plentiful supply on Earth.

Though there are few glances into DeGill's personal life, he has a brother named Tex DeGill, who is a sheriff in a western-styled water planet, and a niece, Lilly Rose who is also in law enforcement; as well as a teenage son named Bill. The villainess Pontifidora was once his fiancée and her vendetta against DeGill is mainly due to how their relationship ended. Ironically, Pontifidora ended up being the mother of DeGill's only child, Bill.

The Barrett Family

Beatrixo Barrett
Beatrixo Barrett (Jayne Eastwood) is the wife of Dr. Barrett, the mother of Tanya Barrett, the mother-in-law of Mr. Barrett, and the grandmother of Betty and Kyle. A lively older woman with a love of clog dancing and numerous other talents, she lives on her farm in the countryside just outside Moose Jaw Heights. However, she was also one of the first Galactic Guardians, and, in her younger years, looked like an adult version of Betty. She only comes out of retirement occasionally if Betty is in serious need of help.

Despite being retired, most of her old equipment remains functional; her starcruiser, the Century Warbler, remains operational. Betty had discovered her own grandmother's past when she discovers her old Galactic Guardian bracelet in her attic, but she at first shrugs it off as merely being a coincidence. In "Evil Idol", she presents Betty with a special locket for her birthday, to be used whenever she encountered trouble; when Maximus later captures her on a Galactic Guardian mission that day, Betty discovers her grandmother's past when the locket is revealed to be a signal beacon; Beatrixo manages to save Betty and her crew.

Beatrixo has a younger sister called "Auntie Matter" (a pun on antimatter) who she has a bitter rivalry with. Auntie Matter is also one of Beatrixo's old archenemies from her youth mainly due to her little sister's alien ability to transform into a black hole which according to her she inherited from their father. Beatrixo however is said to take after their mother, who possessed no special abilities. At one time or another, Beatrixo and Auntie Matter had a romantic rivalry as well (fighting over various male sweethearts and boyfriends), which includes Beatrixo's husband.

Dr. Barrett

Dr. Barrett (William Shatner in "The No-L 9", Gary Krawford in Mission: Earth) is the husband of Beatrixo Barrett, the father of Tanya Barrett, the father-in-law of Mr. Barrett, and the grandfather of Betty and Kyle. He was a scientist who was studying the musicality of space rocks. He was lost years earlier while trying to discover sounds on a distant planet, but was found on The No-L 9, a collection of singing planets in "The No-L 9". Betty manages to find him, but not before protecting the planets from Maximus. Since then, he has settled in the Moose Jaw countryside with Bea.  He later makes a reappearance in "Wedding Crashers", when Bea and he decide to organize a "second wedding", attended by both Betty's parents and the entire Galactic Guardian organization. Beatrixo's evil sister Auntie Matter is jealous of her sister's relationship with him, to the point, she kidnaps him in "Wedding Crashers" and tries to grant him superpowers like hers so she can marry him. However, he is saved by Bea with a little help from their granddaughter.

Kyle

Kyle (Cole Caplan) is the grandson of Dr. Barrett and Beatrixo, the nephew of Tanya Barrett and Betty's dad, and Betty's cousin. He's self-centered, arrogant, bratty, and thinks that anything not to his liking is stupid. This usually means anything Betty or her friends like. He also has a talent for causing havoc that eventually gets him into trouble.
In the older episodes, he was a bucktoothed redhead but he later had brown hair and normal teeth.

Mr. Barrett

Mr. Barrett (Patrick McKenna) is the husband of Tanya Barrett, the father of Betty Barrett, the son-in-law of Dr. and Beatrixo Barrett, and the uncle of Kyle. He is a slightly absent-minded, stereotypical 1950's salesman who is usually busy with whatever new gadget he is trying to sell, but he is a devoted father when he's around. He sometimes spends time with Betty on father-daughter day weekends.

Tanya Barrett

Tanya Barrett (Kristina Nicoll) is the wife of Mr. Barrett, the mother of Betty Barrett, the daughter of Dr. and Beatrixo Barrett, and the aunt of Kyle. She is a homemaker and a stay-at-home mom who is largely oblivious to Betty's adventures, as she spends most of her day fussing over her cat, Purrsy. With a pouf blonde ponytail and tacky animal-print clothes, she dresses like a stereotypical hairdresser, but her actual skills at hair-styling are best left unseen.

Supporting characters

Noah Parker

Noah Parker (Laurie Elliott) is Betty's best friend and love interest. Although not really a nerd, he's an honor-roll student who enjoys studying mathematics and writing, which makes him a target for Duncan and Penelope's bullying. Unlike Betty, he's not very athletic, and the only sport he seems to be any good at is baseball. He also has a strong crush on Betty, though she seems mostly oblivious to it, and he is generally jealous of whatever boy she's with.

Noah was kept in the dark about Betty's dual-role as a Galactic Guardian until the end of the first season, though on numerous occasions in the first season he was close to deducing Betty's dual role (having hacked into her communications frequency using a satellite radio). He discovers Betty's dual role following the defeat of the villain Pandora; Pandora and her father had been sealed in a box and key, the key has found its way to Earth and into Noah's hands. The key had also teleported Noah into Maximus' lair. As Betty attempts to rescue Noah, Noah inadvertently destroys the Galactic Guardian headquarters. He is later rescued by Paloma, disguised as the Chameleon, and returns to Earth, where he manages to successfully convince Betty and Admiral DeGill to join the Galactic Guardians as a cadet.

Though inexperienced, he is very willing to go on missions (even begging Betty on numerous occasions to let him accompany Betty and her crew on missions specifically assigned to her), and he has saved the day himself. In the ongoing ending sketch "Crash Test Noah", he also acts as a human guinea pig for X-5 to test the various gadgets he invents.

While surviving on Earth, Noah wears a white tank top, a blue jacket, green cargo shorts, and red sneakers.

Regeena Peterson

Regeena Peterson (Leah Renee Cudmore) is a new character introduced in Mission: Earth, who quickly befriends Betty and Noah. She is the daughter of Principal Peterson, and, as far as he is concerned, she's a sweet, demure, respectable girl. But as soon as she turns his back, her real personality comes out, which is quite the opposite. Betty finds Reegena refreshing, and around Regeena she comes out of her shell. In fact, Betty becomes a bit of a project for Reegena; she is determined to make Betty get out and "do stuff!". She has a somewhat bulkier build than most of her classmates, but given her father's athletic interests and build it is quite likely that this is muscle as opposed to fat.

Regeena has a distaste for Penelope after Penelope attempts to woo her upon hearing that she is Principal Peterson's daughter (wanting Regeena to be her friend only to raise Penelope's own social status). In "Girl Power", she unknowingly befriends Sparky, who had been accidentally transformed into a girl. She and the female Sparky become good friends during the episode. When he is returned to normal he passes himself off to Regeena as the brother of his female identity. In later episodes, Regeena is often suspicious of Betty, Noah, or Sparky when they unexpectedly leave for missions, though she often takes their disappearances in stride.

In "Scent of a Blugo", she is shown to have an interest in professional wrestling when she, Betty, and Noah go to the wrestling match. She wears a wrestling mask to show her interest in the sport. While in the stands, she almost recognized Betty but then Noah gave her a full nelson to distract her, causing her to spill her drink onto her mask. In the end, she offered to show Noah some of her moves, giving Noah a noogie while Betty leaves the wrestling match.

In "The Future is Now", Regeena is among the Galactic Guardians of 2013.

Penelope Lang

Penelope Lang (Catherine Disher) is Betty's rival on Earth. She is an arrogant and self-obsessed queen bee, who thinks of herself as the most popular prima donna at her school. Penelope always tries to humiliate Betty in every way. She has a nasally squeaky voice. She is rich, spoiled, and often tries to use her wealth to undermine Betty's social standing, a plan that inevitably backfires. She is usually seen with two sidekicks named Megan and Sarah. She's used to getting her own way — even if it means stepping all over other people. In fact, she enjoys getting her own way more if she has to step over other people to do so. In "Bracelet Yourself", she tampered with Betty's bracelet which is property of the Galactic Guardians, and caused the Starcruiser to lose control. She also seems to not hate, but despise Betty enough to be violent, for in "Pre-Teen Queen of Outerspace", she attempts to kill Betty and her friends, though she thinks it is just a dream, and in "Mirror of Morgana", she kicks Betty in the face. In Beach Blanket Betty, a powerful amulet turns Penelope into a supervillain named Lobsterella. Being Betty's rival, she also dislikes Noah just about as much as she dislikes Betty. In season three, she is occasionally seen with her grandmother Petunia, who is just about as snobbish as she is. Though she has come close to discovering the existence of the Galactic Guardians, she quickly dismisses all of the evidence.

In "The Future is Now", Penelope, while not a Galactic Guardian herself, is freeloading with the remnants of the Galactic Guardians. However, she provides the opportunity for Betty and Noah to steal the time machine back from Maximus and return to the past.

The alien bee people of Droneopolis apparently consider Penelope to be the "Most Evil Female" in the cosmos to the point they kidnap her and create a hybrid clone of Penelope to be their Queen, Queen Penelobee.

Megan

Megan (Stephanie Morgenstern) is one of the two of Penelope's "minions" and the shortest of the trio, she's a chubby little girl with short puffy dirty blond hair & hazel eyes. Her outfit consists of a long-sleeved light blue sweater with white cotton folded back sleeve cuffs & a white folded down V-shaped collar. Also on the front of her sweater in the middle is a big bold letter "M" for her name with a thin white outline around it. Last a knee-length dark blue linen skirt, a pair of white cotton socks, and a pair of black Mary Jane shoes. She is usually seen hanging around her “leader” Penelope; along with her cohort Sarah, or just one of them or on her own, sometimes even featured as a background character. Although she and Sarah are friends with such a vain and mean rude snob like Penelope; snickering at all of her wicked jokes and sarcastic comments towards Betty and her pals plus at any embarrassing misfortunes of theirs and even assisting her in any cruel plots against a Betty and her the others; they don't seem to be as bratty and as nasty as she is. Megan has even shown signs of being on Betty's side on occasion by backing her up against Penelope or even laughing at Penelope when Betty manages to get revenge on her and make her look bad. She has even been complimentary towards Betty, and supportive as well, like for example, admiring Betty's new funky hairdo on school picture day and even happily shouting out "HAPPY BIRTHDAY!!" to Betty when she attended her surprise party.

Sarah

Sarah (Catherine Disher) is Penelope and Megan's friend. She has long black hair and wears a green sweater and glasses. She is also the nicest of the three. She is also friendly and playful.

Chaz Lang

Chaz Lang (Scott McCord) is Penelope's older brother, who had returned from being away at private school in Mission: Earth. According to Penelope, he refused to attend anymore because he found the other kids too snobby. Chaz is athletic, really cool, and an amazing skateboarder, and appears to share a mutual crush with Betty, which makes Noah very jealous. Chaz and his sister don't really get along, as his down-to-earth demeanor makes him the black sheep of his otherwise snooty family. Chaz is unaware of Betty's dual role, but it is hinted that Betty eventually reveals her secret to him, as in "The Future is Now", Chaz is among the Galactic Guardians of 2013.

Dylan

Dylan (Dwayne Hill) is one of Betty's classmates. Tall, athletic, and intelligent, he appealed to just about every girl in school but was interested in Betty because of her interest in science. This began a rivalry between Betty and Penelope over him, though Penelope soon lost interest when she found out he was a bit too geeky for her tastes. Betty has also lost interest in him when Chaz appears in Mission: Earth, and he is only seen in cameos since such as Mirror of Morgana.

Duncan Paine

Duncan Paine (Peter Oldring) is Moose Jaw Heights Junior High's resident school bully, and likes Penelope, although he had a small crush on Paloma in the episode "The X-Rays". Duncan, like Penelope, often bosses people around and is not very well-liked for his bully image, though he is not really that descriptive on any show, but "Bracelet Yourself" where he tampered with Betty's bracelet which is property of the Galactic Guardians and ended up insulting Maximus with it. In "Takes One To Know One" he chases after Paloma who pranked him and became suspicious after he saw Paloma getting abducted by her evil twin sister Pandora. In season three it is hinted he is fond of Penelope.

Principal Chet Peterson

Principal Chet Peterson (Dwayne Hill) is Betty's African-Canadian school principal. Tough but fair, he takes his interest in hockey to the point of obsession. His office is decorated with tons of memorabilia and he even has a penalty box in his office where he puts kids who have misbehaved. He also likes to sprinkle his everyday speech with metaphors from hockey and other sports. His voice and style of dress are patterned after veteran hockey commentator Don Cherry.

The Osborne Twins

Chip and Dalton Osborne (both Michael D'Ascenzo) are two of Betty's male friends, though they are rarely featured. They are both guitarists on Betty's band, and had, on one occasion, unknowingly was the basis of one of Maximus' evil schemes.

Mr. Parker

Noah's father (Dwayne Hill) is a brilliant inventor but is seen as a crackpot as he is convinced of the existence of aliens and obsessed with proving it. He is also quite suspicious of Betty because whenever something odd happens in Moose Jaw Heights she usually seems to be involved.

Mrs. Dourly

Mrs. Dourly (Robin Duke) was originally a substitute teacher in Betty's art class and a scout leader but in later seasons is Betty's regular teacher.

Coach Sorenson

Coach Sorenson (Neil Crone) is the school's slightly misogynistic physical education teacher and local hockey coach.

Villains

Maximus I.Q.

Maximus I.Q. (Colin Fox) and (Mike Marshall) is the main antagonist of the series and Atomic Betty's archenemy. The self-proclaimed Supreme Evil Overlord of the Galaxy, Maximus I.Q. has only one driving ambition — to rule the galaxy. A cat-like appearance and a somewhat regal bearing (even if he's the only one who believes so), however, like any other cat, he hates getting wet, to the point where it is enough to distract him from his schemes. He is also ill-tempered, self-important, overbearing, scheming, two-faced, abusive, selfish and thievish. His citadel contains various stolen items, such as a Starcruiser from "Best (Mis) Laid Plans" and a table from "The Minion". He is a parody of Flash Gordon's adversary Ming the Merciless.

He commands a sizable army consisting of both robot subjects and the ninja-like Bloodmonks of Morbidia; he is also one of the larger collectors of rubber and glass ducks. Despite his hatred of Betty, he has occasionally teamed up with her: either to foil the plans of his own father, Max Sr. or, in "Takes One to Know One", to recover one of his stolen ducks from the villainess Pandora.

Among Maximus' goals is to locate and destroy Galactic Guardian headquarters, as well as to locate and destroy Betty's home planet. He manages to do the former in "No Space Like Home", and has come close to doing the latter on numerous occasions, before ultimately being repelled by Betty each time. In Mission: Earth, his two goals have become the same, following the relocation of Galactic Guardian headquarters to Moose Jaw.

His most complex plan culminates in "The Future is Now", when he travels into the future using X-5's recently built time machine in a bid to take over the Earth; however, Betty and Noah manage to elude capture. By 2013, he had managed to enslave all of Moose Jaw, including the Galactic Guardians, centering his stronghold in Beatrixo's farm. Betty and Noah manage to repair an old nonfunctional prototype time machine and pursue Maximus into the future, but they, along with the remnants of the Galactic Guardians (Betty, Noah, Chaz, Regeena, and Penelope of 2013), are captured. Betty manages to trick Maximus into "repairing" his time machine, but the Galactic Guardians of 2013 manage to distract Maximus long enough for Betty and Noah to take control of the time machine themselves. Returning to the past, Betty and Noah convince the Galactic Guardians to instead present their nonfunctional prototype time machine, which Maximus subsequently captures.

Minimus P.U.

Minimus P.U. (Len Carlson in seasons 1-2, Dwayne Hill in Mission: Earth) is abiogenetically engineered assistant for Maximus (P.U. is stated to stand for "Portable Underling"). Minimus can withstand "extremely high" levels of "verbal and physical abuse" from Maximus. Minimus's "swivel-head" feature allows him to switch between his two faces, one being a sycophant, the other a grumbler. Depending on Minimus' mood, his head will swivel around to display the appropriate face with a loud clicking sound; the other face, when not in use, has its eyes closed and is considered dormant. He, like Maximus, is also a liar due to having two faces. Though frequently abused, he remains the top underling of Maximus, though it is only in Mission Earth that he is more aware of his master's abuses. Len Carlson voiced the character until he died in 2006; Dwayne Hill voiced Minimus in Mission: Earth.

In Mission: Earth, viewers learn that he is very lonely and desires company; he keeps the captured Noah company in "No Space Like Home", and many ending sketches depict him as being friends with Sparky.

Atomic Roger

Atomic Roger (Dwayne Hill) is an evil Galactic Guardian, one of Betty's colleagues and occasionally her rival. Though he appears human, he seems to have little actual knowledge of everyday life on Earth. Though exceptionally wicked and vain, especially about his hair (actually a wig), he is nevertheless a highly competent Galactic Guardian.  He is often assigned to deep space patrol, and secretly covets Betty's rank as the top Galactic Guardian due to the fame and recognition it brings. As such, he often goes around and brags to Betty's friends (both on and off Earth) that he is the hero, and the actual secret behind Betty's success and reputation. Even with this he sometimes assists Betty in her times of dire need and gets along well with her and her friends on Earth, making him not so much a villain but a mischievous character. He also may or may not have a crush on Betty.

Atomic Dodger

Atomic Dodger (Dwayne Hill) is Atomic Roger's evil twin brother, identical in every way except for Dodger's orange visor and five o'clock shadow. It is also mentioned that his hair is real compared to Atomic Roger's wig. He and his brother Rodger both wanted to be Galactic Guardians. Dodger attempted to exact revenge on the Galactic Guardians on his brother's behalf when Roger was dismissed from the Guardians, however, Roger's own actions in preventing it led to his being reinstated and now Atomic Dodger wants revenge on both Galactic Guardians and his brother.

Auntie Matter

Auntie Matter (Debra McGrath) is Betty's great-aunt and Beatrixo's little sister. The two have an extreme case of sibling rivalry and are always fighting. She has the ability to transform her body into a Black Hole and send all the things she sucks up into her body into deep space. According to her, this power comes from her father's side of the family and her older sister, Beatrixo, is more like their mother, who has no powers. She was imprisoned on a distant asteroid until she was accidentally freed; however, Betty and Beatrixo managed to team up and imprison her once again. Betty's mother appears to not have inherited these powers, this may be because they skip a generation, It is not yet known if Betty has inherited these powers either.

She later returned in the season 3 episode "Wedding Crashers" and attempts to kidnap Jimmy and make him her husband, only to be stopped once again by Betty and Beatrixo. Since then, she has kept an eye out for not only Jimmy but Admiral DeGill as well. Her name is a play on "antimatter".

Bombshelle

Bombshelle (Stacey DePass) is a villainous fashion designer who used a special ray gun called the Beauty Bomber to "makeover" everything she considered ugly. These include turning a factory into a fashionable upside-down pyramid, turning a swimming pool into a pool of pink mud, shaving the hair of the hair beasts in the planet of Nexxus 9 (even though they need the hair to survive the cold and snow of their planet), beautifying the planet Crushton in which she describes it as an "orbiting eyesore", forcing everyone to wear mood suits, etc. She attempted to makeover the entire galaxy, but Betty managed to stop her and it was discovered she was really a short ugly alien inside of a fashionable robot suit as it is destroyed when Bombshelle is defeated. Although she is evil, she is seen as one of the judges (the other two being X-5 and Antoine Lucci) in "Galactic Idol".

The Chameleon

The Chameleon (Cliff Saunders) is an alien capable of taking the shape of any creature or object. He was a former top agent of Maximus, until being fired from Maximus' forces for an unexplained mishap. Since then the Chameleon has been trying to prove himself to be competently evil, doing anything he can to try and reclaim his former position.

The Collector

The Collector is an alien thief in safari gear who attempts to steal historic or rare treasures, all while filming his exploits as though he were starring in a documentary. Though constantly trying to look heroic for the camera, he has his sarcastic robotic assistant, Wrybot, do most of the dirty work. For his part, Wrybot is dissatisfied with his position with The Collector (being that the only reason he is with The Collector was that the Collector beat him in a game of Piraxian tic-tac-toe).

Wrybot tries to fight as little as possible and criticizes his boss' adventures. By the end of "The Collector", he asked Betty and her crew to lock him up in a different wing than The Collector when he and The Collector were arrested by Betty and her crew. In "Great Eggspectations", Wrybot is even more dissatisfied with The Collector, complete with bickering, where he had not done so in "The Collector", and is proven that he isn't truly evil and that he only acts evil for The Collector's approval.

Dr. Cerebral

Dr. Cerebral (Dwayne Hill) is a strange being, consisting of a giant brain with a face floating in a glass dome with mechanical legs and arms who yearns to control the universe and eliminate inefficient and unsanitary organic life forms in the process. The self-proclaimed greatest genius in the galaxy, he is always trying to devise ways to destroy other intelligent beings and prove himself the smartest. First, he invented a Stupefactor Ray which, when used to zap people, made them act silly. Then he tried to create a giant robot monster made from stolen data from some of the galaxy's best-programmed robots, including B-1 and X-5; Dr. Cerebral himself would serve as the monster's brain, this plan almost destroyed B-1 and X-5. In the episode "Oy, Robot", he obtained a new robot and used it to convert organic lifeforms into robots, believing that they are superior and cleaner. He even transformed Sparky into a robot, but Betty managed to stop Cerebral and turn everyone back to normal. In its sequel "The Gazundheit Factor", he created an organic life form called "The Gloob" that can eat other life forms, but it was constantly trying to eat Dr. Cerebral instead, later in the episode, Betty and her crew and Dr. Cerebral work together to stop "The Gloob". In the episode's conclusion, he says that he should have known better than to trust an organic life form to do his evil bidding ("Ugh! I should have known better than to trust an organic life form to do my evil bidding") when both Dr. Cerebral and "The Gloob" were arrested by Betty and her crew (Dr. Cerebral and "The Gloob" became cellmates). He later returned in the season 3 episode "Rodeo Robots" in which he used a remote control from Crushton to take control of Robo-Betty and use her to try and destroy the Galactic Guardians.

Enormo

Despite the name, Enormo is a diminutive alien whose frustration at being so small has boiled over into plots of revenge. Armed with a ray that shrinks anything it hits, he plans to make himself the largest and most powerful being in the galaxy. He is accompanied by a pet named Griffin, who, similar to the mythical beast, are half dog and half eagle.

Greenbeard

Greenbeard (Len Carlson) is the leader of a band of space pirates who seek out treasures left behind by their former owners or steal outright from starships unfortunate enough to cross their path. With a long coat, mechanical parrot, and a peg leg, he also upholds many old traditions of classic pirates, including walking the plank and keelhauling. He is a parody of Blackbeard.

Hopper the Chopper

Hopper the Chopper (Ron Pardo) is a humanoid fish alien and a space cowboy who robs planets. In "Solar System Surfin'", he tried to transport aquatic wild west sharks, and in its sequel, "The Great SubTRAINean Robbery", he tried to hijack a chemical called Polydenum, which could make ordinary steel or any weapon indestructible, from a train and tied Tex DeGill (Admiral DeGill's brother) onto a train track, but Hopper was stopped and Tex was saved with the help of Lily-Rose (Tex's Daughter) who led Betty to a shortcut. Hopper also made an appearance in the Season 2 premiere, "Bracelet Yourself", when he tried sending Sparky, X-5, and the Star Cruiser into the sun.

Iciclia

Iciclia (Kristina Nicoll) is a character reminiscent of the Witch Queen from Snow White; her trademark attacks are ice-based, using a scepter which fires a beam that freezes any target within its range. Queen of the ice planet Glacies, Iciclia is an icy, mean, cold-hearted, ugly old hag and was once dependent on montegoberries to keep her youth and beauty, but she seems to have eliminated this dependency somehow. She has a sidekick named Dingleberry (James Rankin), a large alien creature with a morning star for a left arm. She is at home only in climates as icy and cold as she is because if she were in a warm climate, she would melt.

Infantor

Infantor (Jonathan Wilson) is an incredibly spoiled, foul-tempered, 1930's gangster-like evil alien infant who enjoys playing games with his enemies. He thinks the galaxy is his own personal box of toys and, accordingly, he wants and demands everything. He is usually accompanied by his "Termi-Nanny", a robotic henchman designed to look like a nanny. He is very intelligent for his seeming age and has tried many plans, such as extracting the multi-colored magma from the planets of Colorosia, the most vibrant galaxy in the entire universe, to make his own line of action figures. He also once sucked Betty and her crew into a virtual reality game to fight for their lives according to his rules and used mind-controlling chocolate chip cookies to form his own Brat Pack army. In "Family Feuds", it is revealed that he has a younger brother who is bigger than him, literally.

Kareena

Kareena (Katie Griffin) is a feline alien with blue hair, white fur with blue tiger stripes, and red eyes. She was a former student of Spindly Tam Kanushu at the same time that Betty was in training. However, Kareena was a snob who was lazy, idled her time away playing video games instead of focusing on her training, and cheated on all her tests by copying off Betty during a test. She refuses to acknowledge her behavior, insisting that Betty stole her position as a Galactic Guardian by charming her way into being Spindly Tam's favorite student. She is, nevertheless, an expert in robotics.

Max Sr.

Max Sr. (Don Francks) is the father of Maximus.  Like his son, he is a criminal, though more in the style of a gang as opposed to his son's super-villainy. It is implied in "The No-L 9" that he was Maximus' predecessor in his evil empire before his son had inherited it. As such, while he has henchmen, he does not have a paramilitary force. Even though Maximus is a successful supervillain, his father still treats him like he is worthless and insults him at every turn; Maximus stated that growing up, his father constantly teased and taunted him. As such, Maximus often assists (though discreetly) in bringing his father to justice.

Max Sr. also has a father, Max Sr. Sr., who acts in the same manner when dealing with his child and grandchild. Both are willing to assist Betty in stopping him in exchange for various concessions.

M'Lord Orus

M'Lord Orus (Ron Pardo) is a smelly being who tried to pollute other planets by sending garbage. In "Planet Stinxx", M'Lord Orus polluted Edenia which turned the Edenians into his mutant henchmen. In its sequel "A Fungus Amongus", he escaped his rocket prison from "Planet Stinxx" (instead of polluting a planet, it endlessly orbited the galaxy) with help from a metal-eating fungus that had grown in his ship that he named Shermie the Germie, and was plotting revenge on the Galactic Guardians for arresting him, later in the episode, he and Shermie the Germie were both defeated by Sparky's homemade slug worm soup, which proved to be the thing that can dissolve the fungi. His name is a play on the word "malodorous".

Nuclea

Nuclea (Julie Lemieux) is a Cruella de Vil-esque female alien with wild Medusa-like hair that is fatally shocking to the touch. She is an energy-based being whose power (and size) increases as she consumes more energy and she has the power to conjure lightning blasts of various intensities and lengths. She continually uses new methods to secure large sources of energy to absorb. She is basically a human lightning bolt of energy, but that, of course, is not enough power for her. In the episode "Nuclea Infected", she tried to absorb the gravitational power of a Grey Hole, which is a smaller, more manageable version of a Black Hole, to be able to convert solid matter into pure nuclear energy on the subatomic level, making her unstoppable. At the end of the episode, she is presumed dead after Betty tricked her into sucking up proto-stars, as she is neither seen nor mentioned after this episode. Her name is a play on the word "nuclear".

Pandora

Pandora (Nahid Islam) was Paloma's evil twin sister and is one of the twin daughters of Golgotha and the demon, Pandora looks exactly like Paloma, but with purple hair, yellow eyes, and lighter skin, she wears a green cloak and body armor. Long ago, Pandora attempted a galactic takeover, but her evil plot was squashed by the Galactic Guardians after they were tipped off by Paloma. Since then, Pandora has sought to revive her father, imprisoned in a box under the guard of Spindly Tam Kanushu. She had kidnapped Admiral DeGill, Spindly Tam Kanushu, and Paloma to this end, using Paloma's life force and the box's key, hidden in a ceramic duck that Maximus had recently acquired, to revive him. She is ultimately beaten by Betty, Juanita, Sparky, X-5, DeGill, Spindly Tam, and Paloma, and sealed up in the box along with her father, never to hurt anyone ever again.

Pontifidora the Conquistadora

Pontifidora (Carolyn Hay) is a former big-game hunter turned bounty hunter. She was Admiral DeGill's fiancée before turning to a life of crime. DeGill then turned her into the authorities before running off with a showgirl from the planet Vega. She has never forgiven DeGill for either act and is determined to have him stuffed and mounted on her wall. In "DeGill & Son", it is revealed that she and DeGill have a son, Bill DeGill.

Queen Penelobee

Queen Penelobee (Catherine Disher) is a clone of Penelope, created from a mix of alien bee and human DNA. After the death of their previous queen, the alien bee people of Droneopolis decided to choose a new queen from the "most evil female" in the cosmos; they had concluded that this person was Penelope. Penelope was abducted, but was later rescued by Betty and her crew; all the while, Penelope had thought the incident was only a dream. However, the bees of Droneoplis had managed to retain a strand of Penelope's hair. DNA was used from the hair, along with some of their own DNA to create a hybrid clone of Penelope as their new queen.

Queen Penelobee is similar to Penelope in most aspects, but is unfamiliar with Betty (ironic as Betty and Penelope interact regularly) and has romantic feelings for Sparky after he had posed as a "king bee" in "Bee Movie". It is only in "Queen For a Day" that Queen Penelobee and Penelope meet in person (though Penelope believes the bees to be part of a virtual reality game); the bees of Droneopolis were willing to obey both due to their common hatred of Betty.

The Scribe

The Scribe, the real name Milton Scrivener (James Rankin), was a writer who got tired of publishers rejecting his works; Sparky was the only admirer of his works. According to X-5, his works are sub-standard, and therefore only interest species of low-level intelligence. After being tired of constant rejection, Scrivener finds a book with a magical quill pen, which allows him to capture any idea and store it within the book's pages. The book also acts as his personal transport, allowing him to fly, and also allows him to make real anything stored within its pages. With it, Scrivener plots to capture every writer in the galaxy and take their ideas as their own.

In "The Scribe", after a series of brazen kidnappings, Admiral DeGill volunteers himself as bait during a book signing of his memoirs; however, due to Sparky being distracted from reading the book, DeGill is captured. The Scribe is ultimately apprehended when Betty and her crew foil an attempt by The Scribe to destroy his own book (which would also destroy all its contents); Sparky had distracted The Scribe by asking for an autograph for his book. The Scribe appears next in "Scribe 2: The ReScribing" when Sparky visits Scrivener in prison with a pile of books that Sparky takes from an evidence locker; Scrivener discovers that among the books is the mystical book. Having discovered that Scrivener is no longer Sparky's favorite author, Scrivener takes the role of The Scribe to exact revenge on Sparky's new favorite author, Lola Polaris (which, in turn, is the pen name of Sparky's mother Zulia). Though having lost the magical quill pen in an encounter with Betty and X-5, The Scribe manages to kidnap Zulia and hold her hostage in an isolated cabin on Glaces. Zulia is ultimately freed by Sparky (desperate to save his mother) and Iciclia (who is a fan of Lola Polaris), and The Scribe is ultimately imprisoned in his own book.

The Scribe would make a reappearance in "Fairytale Fate", when he attempts to imprison Betty, Noah, Sparky, and X-5 in his work of mixed-up fairy tales, where every story sees a character modeled after Betty meeting her doom. After capturing The Scribe's magical pencil, Noah manages to rewrite the endings to each story to allow their escape, as well as forcing The Scribe back into the real world; he is quickly then apprehended.

Shaka Booga

Shaka Booga (Julie Lemieux) was apparently a prehistoric witch doctor who tried to devolve civilians into cavemen using a magical powder in "Devolution City", similar to the situation of the third-season episode "Head Shrinker Much?" from Totally Spies!. She attempted to drop her devolution powder into the planets tar pits, thereby causing the planet to devolve into a black hole, thereby sucking up the entire galaxy, and even turned Betty's bracelet primitive, however, she was beaten when Sparky tied her up with his yo-yo which, being already primitive, was not affected by the powder.

The X-Rays

They are a trio of ruffians, named Plutor (Hunter Hayes), Bubba (Dwayne Hill),  and Furball (Dwayne Hill) who were wreaking havoc across the galaxy. These include drawing a picture of Admiral DeGill as a woman, stealing candy from babies, vandalizing billboards, stealing ships from Maximus' citadel (especially stealing a Starcruiser from the episode "Best (Mis) Laid Plans" that was already stolen by Maximus), etc.

Minor characters

B-1

B-1 (Len Carlson in seasons 1-2, Dwayne Hill in Mission: Earth), X-5's "uncle", is an older model robot formerly in service with the Galactic Guardians; in later episodes, he is implied to be one of its founding members. He was discarded on the planet Crushton when he became obsolete. Since then he's led a robot militia against anyone who tries to profit from the planet's giant scrap pile at the cost of what little functionality the robots have.

The Betty Clones

The Betty Clones (all voiced by Tajja Isen) are three once-evil identical clones of Atomic Betty that were created by Maximus from genetic material in a piece of hair that he had sliced off with his laser sword during a duel. The clones look identical to Betty in every way, shape, and form, except for their eye colors, and are dressed in color-coded mockups of the Galactic Guardian uniform. In addition to Betty's DNA, they also have genetic material from being from Maximus' homeworld to augment their abilities, giving them unique superpowers the real Betty does not possess. Clone Betty 1 (the red clone) powers come from Optica, the Fire Witch, giving her the ability to fly and use pyrokinesis; The powers of Clone Betty 2 (the orange clone) come from Destructa, the Rock Princess, allowing her to morph into a larger form with rock-like skin and superhuman strength. Clone Betty 3 (the blue clone) gained the power of Roxanne, the Rubber Woman, giving her the power of stretching her body like rubber.

In "The Trouble with Triplets", Maximus used them to commit crimes and frame the real Betty. In its sequel "The Cheerleaders of Doom", they became cheerleaders and gained the power to use their cheers to hypnotize people to do their bidding in which Maximus calls them his Sirens. They used their powers to steal the blueprints of Galactic Guardian HQ and tried to destroy it, but Betty and her team managed to figure out a way to reverse and duplicate their Cheerleading powers and used them to make the clones speak gibberish, thus rendering their cheerleading powers useless. The Betty Clones reappeared in the season three episode "The Way of the Weiner" to kidnap Spindly Tam for Maximus, at the end of the episode, X-5 rewired the three girls to be kind and act like the real Betty. Since then, they have been passed off as Betty's identical-looking "cousins" from Calgary.

The powers of the Betty Clones are a tribute to the three male members of the Fantastic Four: Clone Betty 1 (and Optica) as the Human Torch, Clone Betty 2 (and Destructa) as the Thing, and Clone Betty 3 (and Roxanne) to Reed Richards.

Chef Bernadette

Chef Bernadette (Kristina Nicoll) was apparently Maximus' personal chef in her appearances before "Poached Egg". In "Poached Egg", she resigned as Maximus' personal chef when she refused to make an omelet out of the last existing Piraxian rhino egg, despite Maximus' order. In the episode's conclusion, she went back to her old job as Maximus' personal chef after Maximus gave up on making an omelet out of a Piraxian rhino egg, and as a result, he ended up nearly eating Minimus instead.

Commander McSlim

McSlim is the director of the Galactic Guardians Training Corps and the Galactic Guardian Academy's most famous instructor.

Flavia

Flavia is the robot protector of the princess from "Martian Makeover" who has similarities to X-5 with a pink bow on her antenna, a dress, human-like eyes, and lips unlike X-5's blue eyes as both robots are secretly in love with each other.

Empress Narcissitad

Empress Narcissitad is a spoiled member of alien royalty. She expects her orders to be carried out immediately and without question. She is allergic to robots much to her disgust. She appears to'd softened up after becoming engaged. She has an uncanny resemblance to Princess Leia from Star Wars.

Paloma

Paloma (Alexandra Lai), introduced in the second season, is, on the outside, an Latin-Canadian classmate of Betty's who, after some rocky starts, soon fits into her circle of friends. It soon becomes obvious, though, that she knows more about life off of Earth than she should, and she has some very strange abilities, which, when asked, are merely passed off as an uncanny "way with animals".

She is one of the twin daughters of the villain Golgotha, the queen of the planet Sharbena, whose people can shapeshift into any living creature they desire. The people of the planet had lived in peace for centuries, due to no army being able to beat a race that could mimic them down to the last detail. She had unsuccessfully tried to convince her own people that their powers were divine and that the rightful place for Sharbenians was as rulers of the universe. In response, she unleashed an evil demon among the people, bringing a reign of terror across the galaxy. The people of Sharbena could not stop it, for the demon was not a living creature and could not be duplicated. Golgotha fell in love with the demon and they caused untold destruction. The reign of terror was ultimately stopped by the best warriors from other planets, who had banded together to form the Galactic Guardians. The Galactic Guardians had sealed the demon in a box, but Golgotha managed to escape and hideout. In hiding, she gave birth to the demon's children, twin daughters Paloma and Pandora.

Pandora looks very similar to Paloma except she has gold eyes and purple hair.

Paloma had inherited her demon father's good powers (along with her mother's ability to shapeshift into any living creature). Paloma tipped off the guardians when her twin sister Pandora attempted a galactic takeover. To protect her, she was placed in the Galactic Guardians' witness protection program, hoping not to be discovered.  Under the program, Paloma is looked after by a Galactic Guardian named Juanita (Nissae Isen), who, on the outside, is introduced as Paloma's younger sister.

Eventually, she is later discovered and captured by her twin sister Pandora, who had hatched a plot to sacrifice her to unseal their demon father from the box. Paloma is rescued by Betty and Juanita, and uses her powers to seal Pandora and her own father back in the box: however, as Betty and Paloma would learn, the sealing had caused Noah to be abducted.

With Moose Jaw now in hysteria over the disappearances of both Paloma and Noah, Paloma returns to Earth to convince the populace that the abductions were all part of the opening of a new movie. Following the destruction of Galactic Guardian headquarters, Paloma also assists in the construction of their new temporary headquarters underneath Moose Jaw. When the Noah that Betty rescued was ultimately exposed as Maximus' henchman, the Chameleon, Paloma ultimately rescues the real Noah from Maximus by disguising herself as the Chameleon. However, this causes Maximus' rage to boil over, and he threatens to destroy Earth while chasing Betty's ship. Paloma and Juanita decide to leave Betty and her crew and take control of Betty's starcruiser, and lead Maximus on a wild goose chase as Betty and her crew escapes on an escape pod.

It is implied that she later manages to return to Earth, as Betty is seen piloting the starcruiser in later episodes, though she does not play a further role in the series, but is seen later in the third season in the background crowd of a school dance in "Love Bites".

Purrsy

Purrsy (Juan Chioran), short for Sir Purrsefus, is the family's spoiled, surly, petty, jealous and conniving Siamese cat. Betty's mother lavishes him with affection and considers him a second child, though Betty and Purrsy rarely get along. He's also the only one in Betty's immediate family who's aware of her double life as a Galactic Guardian.

Though originally an ordinary house cat, Purrsy has since gained the ability to speak in a French accent (in "If the Shoe Fits") which he has used in various ending sketches. In fact, his personal appearance is very similar to that of Maximus I.Q.

Robo-Betty

Robo-Betty (Tajja Isen) is a robotic clone of Betty created by Sparky, who had assembled it from a mail-in kit. The robot is in reality a skeleton like a robot with a holographic coating that occasionally flashes back to the underneath. She was originally sent by Sparky to cover for Betty at Noah's birthday party when Betty herself was on an adventure. However, in the middle of a death trap, Betty discovers this and recalls her as she and her crew were about to be killed by Maximus. Robo-Betty manages to free Betty and her crew, but when the object of her mission, Captain Lure, was revealed to be a robot carrying a bomb, Robo-Betty attempts to remove Captain Lure by pushing it out of the ship and into space.

However, Lure had managed to hold on to Robo-Betty, removing her from the ship as well, while Lure drifted by to Maximus's base and destroyed it with his bomb Robo-Betty had presumably been lost in space. In reality, she had survived the explosion and drifted the galaxy before crash landing on Crushton, where she was repaired by B-1. When, on another mission, Betty is forced to have her ship repaired on Crushton from being repeatedly battered by a super-powered Maximus, Robo-Betty resurfaces to help defeat Maximus and subsequently toke him into custody. Robo-Betty would reappear in "Rodeo Robots", where she was put under the control of the villain Dr. Cerebral using an old remote control he had discovered on Crushton.

However, Betty and B-1 had managed to break Cerebral's control over her. Robo-Betty is identical in appearance to Betty, though in the first two seasons, her eyes would occasionally glow red and her holographic appearance would occasionally expose the robot underneath, to differentiate her from the real Betty. In Mission: Earth, her eyes have gained a permanent red color, partly as a result due to having been rebuilt by B-1 and has had the bugs in her holo coating worked out thus she no longer exposes the robotic skeleton underneath, she also briefly donned a cowgirl outfit to blend in with a rodeo.

Spindly Tam Kanushu

Spindly Tam Kanushu (Len Carlson in seasons 1-2, Dwayne Hill in Mission: Earth) is Betty's martial arts trainer and sensei. His first appearance was in the episode "Spindly Tam Kanushu", in which Maximus kidnapped him to teach his Morbidian Blood Monks his Martial Arts knowledge, but instead, he secretly taught them to be dancers. He then made small guest appearances in the episodes "Best (Mis) Laid Plans" and "The Revenge of Masticula". In "Case of the Missing Kanushu", he is kidnapped by his evil student named Koreena, and also appeared in the 2nd-season finale "Takes One to Know One", showing that he was part of Beatrixo's old team.

In Mission: Earth, he has both been seen in his place in space (where various powerful artifacts continue to be kept), as well as a smaller place on Earth, where, in addition to training new Galactic Guardians, he works part-time at a local hotdog stand.

Zulia

Zulia (Kathleen Laskey), Sparky's mother, is a sweet, perfect mother figure to anyone she comes across. She's thoughtful, kind, and an incredible cook who will never let anyone leave her house hungry, but has a fiery temper and a vicious hit with kitchen utensils should anyone threaten her son. She is currently single under unknown circumstances but is looking for another boyfriend/husband. Much to Sparky's dismay, she has a bad habit of dating (male) criminals.

References

 Lists of characters in Canadian television animation
 Lists of characters in French television animation
 Television characters introduced in 2004
 Atomic Betty